Melvin Brown Casados (born 28 January 1979) is a Mexican former professional footballer who played as a centre-back.

Brown made his debut in the Primera División with Cruz Azul in the 2001 Apertura, and quickly became a mainstay at defense for the club. In his three and a half years with the club, he played in 109 games, scoring five goals. Following the 2004 Clausura, Brown was transferred to the Jaguares at the request of his coach at Cruz Azul, José Luis Trejo.

Brown was also a defender for the Mexico national football team, having made his debut for the international side 7 January 2001 against the United States. Although on the roster for the 2002 World Cup, Brown did not see any playing time.

Personal life
Brown's father is Jamaican, and his mother is Mexican. As a result, he holds a Jamaican passport.

Career statistics

International

See also
Afro-Mexicans

References
2.   Interview with Melvin Brown (Jamaican Roots)  http://jamaicatimez.com/2017/02/07/interview-melvin-brown-jamaican-roots/

External links
 

1979 births
Living people
Mexican footballers
Mexico international footballers
Mexican people of Irish descent
Mexican people of Jamaican descent
Association football defenders
Liga MX players
Cruz Azul footballers
Chiapas F.C. footballers
Club Puebla players
Tecos F.C. footballers
Irapuato F.C. footballers
2002 FIFA World Cup players
Footballers from Veracruz